Acracona lamottei is a species of snout moth in the genus Acracona. It was described by Hubert Marion in 1954 and is known from Guinea.

References

Tirathabini
Moths described in 1954
Snout moths of Africa
Moths of Africa